Haburugala is a small town in Sri Lanka. It is located within Southern Province. Sri Punyarathana Dhamma School in Choola Bodhi Viharaya Buddhist temple, Dharmaraja Vidyalaya, Elakaka Maha Vidyalaya schools are situated in Haburugala. Most of the villagers are farmers who spend their time on paddy fields. The path to the village is surrounded by beautiful scenes such as Dedduwa river, Bentotat river, Bentota beach, Dedduwa marshland. Typical day has the temperature around 26 degrees Celsius.

See also
List of towns in Southern Province, Sri Lanka

External links

Populated places in Southern Province, Sri Lanka